Khuntpani (Odia:ଖୁଣ୍ଟପାଣି  ) is a  town in the West Singhbhum district, in the Indian state of Jharkhand.

Geography 
Khuntpani is located 12 km north of district headquarters Chaibasa. It is a block headquarters.

Khuntpani is bordered by West Singhbhum Block on its south, Chaibasa Block on its south, Kharsawan Block on its north and Chakradharpur Block towards west .

Chaibasa, Chakradharpur, Barughutu and Chandil are nearby cities.		

Khuntpani is on the border between West Singhbhum District and Saraikela Kharsawan District.

Demographics  
Odia is the Local Language along with Ho(Dominant), Mundari.

Politics  
J V (P), Bharatiya Janata Party, JMM, JKP and Indian National Congress are the major political parties.

Transport

Rail 
Pandrasali Railway Station and Barabambo Railway Station are the nearest stations.

References

West Singhbhum district